The blood-breasted flowerpecker (Dicaeum sanguinolentum) is a species of bird in the family Dicaeidae. It is found in the Lesser Sunda Islands. Its natural habitats are subtropical or tropical moist lowland forest and subtropical or tropical moist montane forest.

References

blood-breasted flowerpecker
Birds of the Lesser Sunda Islands
blood-breasted flowerpecker
Taxonomy articles created by Polbot